Tendrara is a town and rural commune in Figuig Province, Oriental, Morocco. According to the 2004 census, the town had a population of 6,254.

Near Tendrara, there was a labour camp for Jews during the Vichy era. The prisoners who labored there—Jews from Warsaw, Leipzig, Salzburg, and Bucharest as well as Spaniards and others—lived in tents.

See also
Concentration camps in France

References

Populated places in Oriental (Morocco)
Rural communes of Oriental (Morocco)